Macrobathra heminephela is a species of moth of the family Cosmopterigidae. It is found in Australia.

References

Macrobathra
Moths of Australia
Moths described in 1886